Accuracy is an independent, global consultancy firm headquartered in Paris, France. The firm has offices in 17 locations worldwide. The firm provides advice to corporates and investors on acquisitions, disposals, disputes, restructuring and major decisions.

History 
Accuracy was founded in 2004 by a team of seven former consultants of consulting firm Arthur Andersen, including Frédéric Duponchel, who has been serving as Accuracy’s CEO and Managing Partner since its foundation. The firm now has 57 partners, employs 480 staff worldwide and recorded revenues of €125 million in 2021.

Operations 
Accuracy operates in four situations:

 Transactions & investments – valuations, project advisory and post M&A advisory
 Disputes & crises – litigation & arbitration, recovery, investigations, forensics and project disputes
 Corporate strategy & finance – strategic & financial planning, group & portfolio strategy
 Business performance – business model innovation, smart reporting and transformation

Accuracy’s model excludes all regulated accounting and financial activities, such as statutory audits. The firm is focused on independence and removing conflicts of interest. Accuracy states that it will never work for more than one party on a particular matter. For example, it is relatively common for a consultancy firm to provide advice to more than one potential bidder for an asset, which can be regarded as a conflict of interest.

Locations 
Accuracy now has office in 17 locations worldwide:

 EMEA: Paris, London, Frankfurt, Amsterdam, Munich, Luxembourg, Madrid, Barcelona, Milan, Dubai, Casablanca
 North America: Toronto, Montreal
 APAC: Singapore, Hong Kong, Beijing, New Delhi

References

External links 
 

Financial services companies of France
Companies based in Paris
Financial services companies established in 2004
French companies established in 2004
Management consulting firms of France